Washington Township is one of the thirteen townships of Sherman County, Kansas, United States.  The population was 106 at the 2000 census.

Geography
Located in the eastern part of the county, it borders the following townships:
Shermanville Township — north
Llanos Township — northeastern corner
Union Township — east
Iowa Township — south
Smoky Township — southwestern corner
Itasca Township — west
Voltaire Township — northwest
It lies east of the county seat of Goodland.  There are no cities in the township, although the unincorporated community of Edson lies in the center of the township.

Several intermittent headwaters of Sappa Creek flow through Washington Township.

Transportation
Interstate 70 and U.S. Route 24 run concurrently east–west through Washington Township.  The small K-253 connects Edson with the interstate.  A railroad line also travels east–west through Washington Township, just north of the interstate.

Government
As an active township, Washington Township is governed by a three-member board, composed of the township trustee, the township treasurer, and the township clerk.  The trustee acts as the township executive.

References

External links
County website

Townships in Sherman County, Kansas
Townships in Kansas